Volition is the fourth studio album by Canadian progressive metal band Protest the Hero released on October 29, 2013 through Razor & Tie. It is the band's first album not to be released through Underground Operations or with any financial backing of label support. Instead, the entire album was funded by their fans via an Indiegogo campaign, where they met and exceeded their goal of $125,000 CAD.

It is the first album of the band to not feature its original lineup, it features Chris Adler from Lamb of God on drums after the departure of founding member Moe Carlson, who left the band prior to the recording process. It is also the band's last album with bassist Arif Mirabdolbaghi.

On October 16, due to the album being leaked, the band released the content early to contributors of their IndieGoGo campaign.

The album debuted at No. 20 on the Billboard 200 in the U.S.

Critical reception

At Alternative Press, Kevin Stewart-Panko stated that "[Protest the Hero] have long been the tenuous link between metal old and new, and Volition continues their polished combination of technical thrash, punkish melodies and mining of disparate influences, from '80's maestros Watchtower and Toxik to energy drink mayhem like DragonForce and NOFX." Loudwire's Chad Bowar described the album as "a wild ride that's grounded in excellent musicianship and innovative songwriting".

Chris Adler's involvement on the album was praised, with one reviewer saying that, while "[Protest the Hero's] progressive/metalcore/mathcore/post-hardcore style is nothing like Lamb of God’s... Adler is an extremely skilled player and had no problem fitting right in."

The album won the 2014 Juno Award for Metal/Hard Music Album of the Year.

Track listing

Personnel

Protest The Hero
Rody Walker — vocals
Tim Millar — guitar, piano
Luke Hoskin —  guitar, acoustic guitar
Arif Mirabdolbaghi - bass

Other personnel
Chris Adler — drums
Cameron McLellan — production, engineering,  mixing, bass guitar on track 4, acoustic guitar on track 6
Anthony Calabretta — additional production, mixing
Julius Butty — additional production
Jason Dufour — engineering, digital editing
Jack Clow — assistant engineer, drum technician
Moe Carlson - additional songwriting on tracks 3, 7, 9 and 10
Riley Bell — assistant engineer
Jeff Jordan — album artwork

Guest performances
Jadea Kelly — vocals on tracks 1, 4, 5, 6
Kayla Howran — vocals on track 2
Mark Iannelli — vocals on track 7
AJ Kolar — vocals on track 7
Todd Kowalski — vocals on track 9
Kevin Lewis — vocals on track 11
Josh Hainge — vocals on track 11
Marc Palin — vocals on track 11
Ron Jarzombek — guitar on track 2
Wyatt Schutt — guitar on track 5
Raha Javanfar — violin, fiddle on tracks 1, 2, 5, 8

References

2013 albums
Protest the Hero albums